Spirit of St. Louis Airport  is a public airport located 17 miles (27 km) west of the central business district of St. Louis, in St. Louis County, Missouri, in the city of Chesterfield, United States.  It is owned by St. Louis County and named after the famous Spirit of St. Louis aircraft.

Facilities and aircraft 

For the 12-month period ending December 31, 2017, the airport had 94,764 aircraft operations, an average of 260 per day: 86% general aviation, 12% air taxi, 2% military and less than 1% commercial service. In March 2018, there were 394 aircraft based at this airport: 242 single-engine, 54 multi-engine, 78 jet and 20 helicopters.

In 2007, the airport finished a multimillion-dollar expansion project to add a parallel taxiway to the north of 8L/26R. This added land is currently available to lease with taxiway access.

The Spirit of St. Louis Air Show returned to the airport, May 3–4, 2014, after being absent since 2007. It featured an interactive STEM Expo and a Veteran's Village. The US Navy Blue Angels headlined the event.

References

External links 

Airports in Greater St. Louis
Transportation buildings and structures in St. Louis County, Missouri